The Cross Street Market is a historic marketplace built in the 19th century in Federal Hill, Baltimore, United States. It runs the full length of Cross Street in between Light Street and Charles Street. 

The market has undergone an $8.4 million redevelopment as of spring 2019. Stalls within the market were closed for renovations since fall of 2018.

References

Buildings and structures in Baltimore
Federal Hill, Baltimore
Food markets in the United States

Market halls
Food retailers